This is a list of authors who have written poetry in the Russian language.

Alphabetical list

A

B

C

D

E

F

G

I

K

L

M

N

O

P

R

S

T

U

V

Y

Z

Sources

See also

 List of Russian architects
 List of Russian artists
 List of Russian explorers
 List of Russian inventors
 List of Russian-language novelists
 List of Russian-language playwrights
 List of Russian-language writers
 Russian culture
 Russian poetry
 Russian literature
 Russian language
 :Category:Russian poets

Russian
 
 
 
Poets
Russian literature-related lists

de:Liste russischsprachiger Dichter